Westside Historic District can refer to:

 Westside Historic District (West Point, Georgia), listed on the National Register of Historic Places
 Westside Historic District (Seymour, Indiana), listed on the National Register of Historic Places
 Westside Historic District (Amherst, Massachusetts)